Bade İşçil (born 8 August 1983) is a Turkish actress. She played Banu Sinaner in Kuzey Güney, Işık in Netflix series Aşk 101, Şebnem Sertuna in Ezel, and Pelin in the action-romance-thriller series Ufak Tefek Cinayetler.

Life and career 
Bade İşçil was born on 8 August 1983 in Istanbul. She's a graduate of Yeditepe University's Department of Fashion and Design. She had her acting debut in 2007, with a role in Cine5's Metropol Cafe. From 2009 to 2011, she portrayed the character of "Şebnem Sertuna" on Ezel. She was then cast in the TV series Kuzey Güney. On 31 May 2013, İşcil married businessman Malkoç Sualp whom she had met in March and later gave birth to their son Azur. The couple later got divorced.

Filmography

Awards

References

External links 
 

1983 births
Actresses from Istanbul
Turkish Muslims
Turkish television actresses
Yeditepe University alumni
Living people